John Stronach (1810-1888), younger brother of Alexander Stronach, was a Protestant Christian missionary who served with the London Missionary Society during the late Qing Dynasty China, working primarily at Xiamen [Amoy]. Stronach participated in the translation of the Bible into Chinese.

Works authored or edited

References

Notes

1810 births
1888 deaths
Protestant missionaries in China
Protestant writers
English Protestant missionaries
British expatriates in China